The Cemitério dos Protestantes ("Cemetery of the Protestants") is a historic Protestant cemetery located in the city of São Paulo, Brazil. The cemetery is listed by CONDEPHAAT for its historical, cultural and social importance for the state of São Paulo.

History

Background
When the German professor of law Julius Frank died in 1841, his students decided to bury him within the faculty. The plan was agreed upon and supported by councillor Brotero. However, since Julius Frank was a Protestant, the Roman Catholic bishop  at first protested this decision, because the envisioned burial place was located at the "sacred ground" of the former Convent of the Franciscan Friars. Councillor Brotero eventually managed to get the bishop's consent.

The incident triggered both Catholic and Protestant foreigners living in São Paulo, to build the Cemitério dos Estrangeiros ("Cemetery of the Foreigners") in the Paulistano neighbourhood of Luz in 1844. The cemetery was closed after only a few burials, because the land near São Caetano Road had to make way for a wider Tiradentes Avenue.

Protestant Cemetery
In answer to the closure of the Foreigner's Cemetery, Lutherans, Anglicans and some Presbyterians founded the Associação Cemitério dos Protestantes ("Association of the Cemetery of the Protestants") to create a new burial site. In accordance with 's plans, an administration building and chapel were built. The first burial took place in 1858.

Notable interments

Among the interments are many people belonging to Protestant and Catholic communities.
Ashbel Green Simonton (1833–1867), Presbyterian minister and missionary

References

External links and source 
 Cemitério dos Protestantes - ACEMPRO
 Cemitério dos Protestantes - BillionGraves

Cemeteries in São Paulo
Lutheran cemeteries
Protestant Reformed cemeteries
Anglican cemeteries in South America
1858 establishments in Brazil